Biblidinae is a subfamily of nymphalid butterflies that includes the tropical brushfoots. This subfamily was sometimes merged within the Limenitidinae, but they are now recognized as quite distinct lineages. In older literature, this subfamily is sometimes called Eurytelinae.

As of 2008, some 340 valid species are in this subfamily, placed in 38 genera. Most species of Biblidinae are Neotropical, but there are some Old World species and genera in the tribes Biblidini and Epicaliini.

Systematics 
The Biblidinae are a taxonomically stable monophyletic group, at least since the "wastebin genus" Catagramma was dismantled around 1950. 

The tribes, in the presumed phylogenetic sequence and with notable genera also listed here, are:

Biblidini Boisduval, 1833
 Biblis Fabricius, 1807 (= Zonaga)
 Ariadne Horsfield, 1829 (= Ergolis)
 Laringa Moore, 1901
 Eurytela Boisduval, 1833
 Neptidopsis Aurivillius, 1898
 Mesoxantha Aurivillius, 1898
 Byblia Hübner, 1819 (= Hypanis Boisduval, 1833 (non Pander in Menetries, 1832: preoccupied))
 Mestra Hübner, 1825 (= Cystineura)
 Archimestra Munroe, 1949
 Vila Kirby, 1871 (= Lonia, Neptis Hübner, 1819 (non Fabricius, 1807: preoccupied), Olina Doubleday, 1848 (non Robineau-Desvoidy, 1830: preoccupied))

Epicaliini Guenée, 1865
 Catonephele Hübner, [1819]
 Nessaea Hübner, [1819]
 Myscelia Doubleday, 1844 (= Sagaritis Hübner, 1821 (non Billberg, 1820: preoccupied), Sea)
 Sevenia Koçak, 1996 (= Crenis Boisduval, 1833 (non Hübner, 1821: preoccupied), Sallya Hemming, 1964 (non Yochelson, 1956: preoccupied))
 Eunica Hübner, [1819]
 Cybdelis Boisduval, 1836

Ageroniini Doubleday, 1847
 Hamadryas – cracker butterflies, calico butterflies
 Ectima Doubleday, 1848
 Panacea Godman & Salvin, 1883 (= Pandora Doubleday, 1848 (non Lamarck, 1799: preoccupied))
 Batesia Felder & Felder, 1862

Epiphilini Jenkins, 1987
 Asterope Hübner, [1819]
 Pyrrhogyra Hübner, 1819 (= Corybas)
 Epiphile Doubleday, 1844
 Lucinia Hübner, 1823 (= Autodea)
 Bolboneura Godman & Salvin, 1877
 Temenis Hübner, 1819 (= Callicorina, Paromia Hewitson, 1861 (non Westwood, 1851: preoccupied))
 Nica Hübner, 1826 (= Pseudonica)
 Peria Kirby, 1871 (= Pelia Doubleday, 1849 (non Bell, 1836: preoccupied))

Eubagini Burmeister, 1878
 Dynamine Hübner, 1819 (= Arisba, Eubagis, Sironia)

Callicorini Orfila, 1952 – eighty-eights and relatives
 Diaethria Billberg, 1820
 Callicore Hübner, [1819]
 Perisama Doubleday, 1849 (= Orophila)
 Antigonis Felder, 1861 (= Lincoya)
 Cyclogramma  Doubleday 1847
 Haematera Doubleday, 1849 (= Callidula)
 Paulogramma Dillon, 1948
 Catacore Dillon, 1948

References

Sources
 Hill, R. I., Penz, C. M., & DeVries, P. J. (2002). Phylogenetic analysis and review of Panacea and Batesia butterflies (Nymphalidae). Journal of the Lepidopterists' Society, 56, 199-215.
 Jenkins, D. W. (1983). Neotropical Nymphalidae. I. Revision of Hamadryas. Bulletin of the Allyn Museum, 81, 1-146.
 Jenkins, D. W. (1984). Neotropical Nymphalidae. II. Revision of Myscelia. Bulletin of the Allyn Museum (Gainesville), 87, 1-64.
 Jenkins, D. W. (1985). Neotropical Nymphalidae. III. Revision of Catonephele. Bulletin of the Allyn Museum of Entomology, 92, 1-65.
 Jenkins, D. W. (1985). Neotropical Nymphalidae. IV. Revision of Ectima. Bulletin of the Allyn Museum (Gainesville), 95, 1-30.
 Jenkins, D. W. (1986). Neotropical Nymphalidae. V. Revision of Epiphile. Bulletin of the Allyn Museum (Gainesville), 101, 1-70.
 Jenkins, D. W. (1987). Neotropical Nymphalidae. VI. Revision of Asterope (=Callithea Auct.). Bulletin of the Allyn Museum of Entomology, 114, 1-66.
 Jenkins, D. W. (1989). Neotropical Nymphalidae. VII. Revision of Nessaea. Bulletin of the Allyn Museum (Gainesville), 125, 1-38.
 Jenkins, D. W. (1990). Neotropical Nymphalidae. VIII. Revision of Eunica. Bulletin of the Allyn Museum, 131, 1-177.

External links

  The higher classification of Nymphalidae, at Nymphalidae.net
 Biblidinae Boisduval, 1833 at Markku Savela's Lepidoptera and Some Other Life Forms: Preliminary species list. Version of 18 March 2007. Retrieved 30 May 2007.
Pteron Misspelled as Biblinae. Images. In Japanese but with binomial names.

 
-
Taxa named by Jean Baptiste Boisduval
Butterfly subfamilies